Monnechroma is a genus of beetles in the family Cerambycidae, containing the following species:

 Monnechroma azureum (Demets, 1976)
 Monnechroma hovorei (Giesbert, 1998)
 Monnechroma seabrai (Fragoso & Monné, 1989)
 Monnechroma subpulvereum (Schmidt, 1924)
 Monnechroma tibiale (Giesbert, 1987)
 Monnechroma uniforme (Gounelle, 1911)

The genus is a nomen novum for Martin Schmidt's subgenus Xenochroma (later raised to genus status); the genus Xenochroma was a senior homonym. Miguel A. Monné is the namesake of the genus Monnechroma.

References

Further reading
 
 

Callichromatini